Scottish Landfill Tax (SLfT) is a tax which is charged in Scotland under the Landfill Tax (Scotland) Act 2014. It replaced the UK Landfill Tax from 1 April 2015.

Revenue Scotland administers and collects SLfT with support from the Scottish Environment Protection Agency (SEPA).

The rates of Scottish Landfill Tax (given in £/tonne) are £84.40 (standard rate) and £2.65 (lower rate) from 1 April 2016, increased from the preceding year's rates of £82.60 and £2.60 respectively. The rates for the 2019-20 year will increase to £91.35 (standard rate) and £2.90 (lower rate)

See also
 Taxation in Scotland

References

Biodegradable waste management
Landfill
Waste treatment technology
Waste legislation in the United Kingdom
Waste management concepts
Taxation in Scotland
2015 introductions
2015 establishments in Scotland
Environment of Scotland